Burkes Garden Central Lutheran Church, listed as Burkes Garden Central Church and Cemetery, is a historic Lutheran church, cemetery, and national historic district located at Burke's Garden, Tazewell County, Virginia. The church was built in 1875, and is a plain rectangular frame building, two bays long, with a steep gable roof. It originally served multiple denominations as a union church but has exclusively served the Lutheran denomination in modern times.

The community was an outpost of German immigrants who settled in the backcountry frontier in the late 18th century. The cemetery was founded in 1827, and contains a notable collection of sandstone Germanic gravestones.

It was listed on the National Register of Historic Places in 1979.

References

External links
 

Lutheran churches in Virginia
Churches completed in 1875
19th-century Lutheran churches in the United States
Churches in Tazewell County, Virginia
Cemeteries in Tazewell County, Virginia
Churches on the National Register of Historic Places in Virginia
National Register of Historic Places in Tazewell County, Virginia
Historic districts on the National Register of Historic Places in Virginia